Mattair Springs is a natural spring and 1,188-acre preserve in northeastern Suwannee County, Florida. It is managed by the Suwannee River Water Management District. The property includes upland mixed forest, pine plantations, and sandhills. The sandhill areas are undergoing restoration. Camp Branch is a 200-acre tract nearby. It includes slope forest, xeric hammock, upland mixed forest, bottom land forest and sandhill habitats. Wildlife in the area include gopher tortoise, Suwannee cooter, deer, turkey, and squirrel. Hooded pitcher plants and cedar elm are also present. The Florida Trail passes through the area.

There are two horse trails at Mattair Springs, a perimeter trail marked with white diamonds and an interior trail marked with yellow diamonds. The property also offers wildlife viewing, hiking, and bicycling on trails and administrative roads.

See also
List of Florida state parks
List of Florida state forests
Water management districts in Florida

References

External links
Vimeo video of the springs

Protected areas of Suwannee County, Florida
Springs of Florida
Suwannee River Water Management District reserves
Bodies of water of Suwannee County, Florida